The boys' skeleton event at the 2020 Winter Youth  Olympics took place on 20 January at the St. Moritz-Celerina Olympic Bobrun.

Results
The first run was held at 14:15 and the second run at 15:30.

References

Boys'